Chris Estrada (born February 14, 1983) is an American trampoline gymnast who made his Olympic debut at the 2008 Summer Olympics, finishing in fifteenth position in the Men's Individual competition. He now is coaching in his own gym with his sister in South Texas, where he teaches children ages 14 months to 18 years on trampoline and floor tumbling.

References

1983 births
Living people
American male trampolinists
Olympic gymnasts of the United States
Gymnasts at the 2008 Summer Olympics
Pan American Games medalists in gymnastics
Pan American Games gold medalists for the United States
Gymnasts at the 2007 Pan American Games
Gymnasts at the 2011 Pan American Games
Medalists at the 2007 Pan American Games
20th-century American people
21st-century American people